The Battle of Manila was a major battle of the Philippine campaign of 1944–45, during the Second World War. It was fought by forces from both the United States and the Philippines against Japanese troops in Manila, the capital city of the Philippines. The month-long battle, which resulted in the death of over 100,000 civilians and the complete devastation of the city, was the scene of the worst urban fighting fought by American forces in the Pacific theater. Japanese forces committed mass murder against Filipino civilians during the battle and American firepower killed many people. Japanese resistance and American artillery also destroyed much of Manila's architectural and cultural heritage dating back to the city's founding. Manila became one of the most devastated capital cities during the entire war, alongside Berlin and Warsaw. The battle ended the almost three years of Japanese military occupation in the Philippines (1942–1945). The city's capture was marked as General Douglas MacArthur's key to victory in the campaign of reconquest. To date, it is the last of the many battles fought within Manila's history.

Background

On 9 January 1945, the Sixth U.S. Army under Lt. Gen. Walter Krueger waded ashore at Lingayen Gulf and began a rapid drive south in the Battle of Luzon. On 12 January, MacArthur ordered Krueger to advance rapidly to Manila. The 37th Infantry Division, under the command of Major Gen. Robert S. Beightler, headed south.

After landing at San Fabian on 27 January, the 1st Cavalry Division, under the command of Major Gen. Vernon D. Mudge, was ordered by MacArthur on 31 January, to "Get to Manila! Free the internees at Santo Tomas. Take Malacanang Palace and the Legislative Building.".

On 31 January, the Eighth United States Army of Lt. Gen. Robert L. Eichelberger, including the 187th and 188th Glider Infantry Regiments of Col. Robert H. Soule, and components of the U.S. 11th Airborne Division under Maj. Gen. Joseph Swing, landed unopposed at Nasugbu in southern Luzon and began moving north toward Manila. Meanwhile, the 11th A/B Division's 511th Regimental Combat Team, commanded by Col. Orin D. "Hard Rock" Haugen, parachuted onto Tagaytay Ridge on 4 February. On 10 February, the 11th Airborne Division came under the command of the Sixth Army, and seized Fort William McKinley on 17 February

Swing was joined by the Hunters ROTC Filipino guerrillas, under the command of Lt. Col. Emmanuel V. de Ocampo, and by 5 February, they were on the outskirts of Manila.

Japanese defense

As the Americans converged on Manila from different directions, they found that most of the Imperial Japanese Army troops defending the city had been withdrawn to Baguio, on the orders of General Tomoyuki Yamashita, commander in chief of Japanese Army forces in the Philippines. Yamashita planned to engage Filipino and U.S. forces in northern Luzon in a co-ordinated campaign, with the aim of buying time for the build-up of defenses against the pending Allied invasion of the Japanese home islands. He had three main groups under his command: 80,000 men of the Shimbu Group in the mountains east of Manila, 30,000 of the Kembu Group in the hills north of Manila, and 152,000 in the Shobu Group in northeastern Luzon.

General Yamashita did not declare Manila an open city, although General Douglas MacArthur had done so before its capture in 1941. Yamashita had not intended to defend Manila; he did not think that he could feed the city's one million residents and defend a large area with vast tracts of flammable wooden buildings.

Yamashita did order the commander of Shimbu Group, Gen. Shizuo Yokoyama, to destroy all bridges and other vital installations and then evacuate the city as soon as any large American forces made their appearance. However, Rear Admiral Sanji Iwabuchi, commander of the Imperial Japanese Navy's 31st Naval Special Base Force, was determined to fight a last-ditch battle in Manila, and, though nominally part of the Shimbu Army Group, repeatedly ignored Army orders to withdraw from the city. The naval staff in Japan agreed to Iwabuchi's scheme, eroding a frustrated Yamashita's attempts at confronting the Americans with a concerted, unified defense. Iwabuchi had 12,500 men under his command, designated the Manila Naval Defence Force, augmented by 4,500 army personnel under Col. Katsuzo Noguchi and Capt. Saburo Abe. They built defensive positions in the city, including Intramuros, cut down the palm trees on Dewey Blvd. to form a runway, and set up barricades across major streets. Iwabuchi formed the Northern Force under Noguchi, and the Southern Force under Capt. Takusue Furuse.

Iwabuchi had been in command of the battleship  when she was sunk by a US Navy task force off Guadalcanal in 1942, a blot on his honor which may have inspired his determination to fight to the death. Before the battle began, he issued an address to his men:

We are very glad and grateful for the opportunity of being able to serve our country in this epic battle. Now, with what strength remains, we will daringly engage the enemy. Banzai to the Emperor! We are determined to fight to the last man.

Battle

Santo Tomas internees liberated

On 3 February, elements of the 1st Cavalry Division under Maj. Gen. Verne D. Mudge pushed into the northern outskirts of Manila and seized a vital bridge across the Tullahan River, which separated them from the city proper, and quickly captured Malacanang Palace. A squadron of Brig. Gen. William C. Chase's 8th Cavalry, the first unit to arrive in the city, began a drive toward the sprawling campus of the University of Santo Tomas, which had been turned into the Santo Tomas Internment Camp for civilians and the US Army and Navy nurses sometimes known as the "Angels of Bataan".

Since 4 January 1942, a total of thirty-seven months, the university's main building had been used to hold civilians. Out of 4,255 prisoners, 466 died in captivity, three were killed while attempting to escape on 15 February 1942, and one made a successful breakout in early January 1945.

Capt. Manuel Colayco, a USAFFE guerrilla officer, became an allied casualty of the city's liberation, after he and his companion, Lt. Diosdado Guytingco, guided the American First Cavalry to the front gate of Santo Tomas. Struck by Japanese bullets, Colayco died seven days later in Legarda Elementary School, which became a field hospital. At 9 PM, five tanks of the 44th Tank Battalion, headed by "Battlin' Basic", headed into the compound.

The Japanese, commanded by Lt. Col. Toshio Hayashi, gathered the remaining internees together in the Education Building as hostages, and exchanged pot shots with the Americans and Filipinos. The next day, 5 February, they negotiated with the Americans to allow them to rejoin Japanese troops to the south of the city, carrying only individual arms. The Japanese were unaware the area they requested, was the now American-occupied Malacañan Palace, and soon afterwards were fired upon and several were killed, including Hayashi.

On 4 February, the 37th Infantry Division freed more than 1,000 prisoners of war, mostly former defenders of Bataan and Corregidor, held at Bilibid Prison, which had been abandoned by the Japanese.

Encirclement and massacres
Early on 6 February, General MacArthur announced that "Manila had fallen"; in fact, the battle for Manila had barely begun. Almost at once the 1st Cavalry Division in the north and the 11th Airborne Division in the south reported stiffening Japanese resistance to further advances into the city.

General Oscar Griswold continued to push elements of the XIV Corps south from Santo Tomas University toward the Pasig River. Late on the afternoon on 4 February, he ordered the 2nd Squadron, 5th Cavalry Regiment, to seize Quezon Bridge, the only crossing over the Pasig that the Japanese had not destroyed. As the squadron approached the bridge, Japanese heavy machine guns opened fire from a formidable roadblock thrown up across Quezon Boulevard, forcing the cavalry to stop its advance and withdraw until nightfall. As the Americans and Filipinos pulled back, the Japanese blew up the bridge.

On 5 February, the 37th Infantry Division began to move into Manila, and Griswold divided the northern section of the city into two sectors, with the 37th responsible for advancing to the south, and the 1st Cavalry Division responsible for an envelopment to the east. The Americans secured the northern bank of the Pasig River by 6 February, and had captured the city's water supply at the Novaliches Dam, Balara Water Filters, and the San Juan Reservoir.

On 7 February, Gen. Beightler ordered the 148th Regiment to cross the Pasig River and clear Paco and Pandacan. The bitterest fighting for Manila – which proved costliest to the 129th Regiment – was in capturing the steam-driven power plant on Provisor Island, where the Japanese held out until 11 February. By the afternoon of 8 February, 37th Division units had cleared most of the Japanese from their sector, but the residential districts were damaged extensively. The Japanese added to the destruction by demolishing buildings and military installations as they withdrew. Japanese resistance in Tondo and Malabon continued until 9 February.

Trying to protect the city and its civilians, MacArthur had stringently restricted U.S. artillery and air support. Yet, by 9 February, American shelling had set fire to a number of districts. "If the city were to be secured without the destruction of the 37th and the 1st Cavalry Divisions, no further effort could be made to save buildings, everything holding up progress would be pounded." Iwabuchi's sailors, marines, and Army reinforcements, having initially had some success resisting American infantrymen armed with flamethrowers, grenades and bazookas, soon faced direct fire from tanks, tank destroyers, and howitzers, which blasted holes in one building after another, often killing both Japanese and civilians trapped inside, without differentiation.

Subjected to incessant pounding and facing certain death or capture, the beleaguered Japanese troops took out their anger and frustration on the civilians caught in the crossfire, committing multiple acts of severe brutality, which later would be known as the Manila Massacre. Violent mutilations, rapes, and massacres of the populace accompanied the battle for control of the city. Massacres occurred in schools, hospitals and convents, including San Juan de Dios Hospital, Santa Rosa College, Santo Domingo Church, Manila Cathedral, Paco Church, St. Paul's Convent, and St. Vincent de Paul Church. Dr Antonio Gisbert told of the murder of his father and brother at the Palacio del Gobernador, saying, "I am one of those few survivors, not more than 50 in all out of more than 3,000 men herded into Fort Santiago and, two days later, massacred."

The Japanese forced Filipino women and children to be used as human shields into the front lines to protect Japanese positions. Those who survived were then murdered by the Japanese.

By 12 February Iwabuchi's artillery and heavy mortars had been destroyed, and with no plan for withdrawal or regrouping, "each man had his meager supply of rations, barely sufficient arms and ammunition, and a building in which his life would end..." The 1st Cavalry Division reached Manila Bay on 12 February, but it was not until 18 February that they took Rizal Stadium, which the Japanese had turned into an ammunition dump, and Fort San Antonio Abad. On 17 February, the 148th Regiment took the Philippine General Hospital, freeing 7,000 civilians, the University of the Philippines Padre Faura campus, and Assumption College San Lorenzo's original Herran-Dakota campus.

Iwabuchi was ordered by Gen. Shizuo Yokoyama, commander of the Shimbu Group, to break out of Manila on the night of 17–18 February, in coordination with counter-attacks on Novaliches Dam and Grace Park. The breakout failed and Iwabuchi's remaining 6,000 men were trapped in Manila.

By 20 February, the New Police Station, St. Vincent de Paul Church, San Pablo Church, the Manila Club, City Hall and the General Post Office were in American hands. The Japanese retreated into Intramuros on the night of 19 February, and the Manila Hotel was liberated on 22 Feb., but MacArthur found his penthouse in ashes. Only Intramuros, plus the Legislative, Finance, and Agricultural Buildings, remained in Japanese hands.

Intramuros devastated

The assault on Intramuros started at 07:30 on 23 February, with a 140 gun artillery barrage, followed by the 148th attacking through breaches made in the walls between the Quezon and Parian Gates, and the 129th crossing the Pasig River, then attacking near the location of the Government Mint.

The fighting for Intramuros continued until 26 February. On 23 February, the Japanese released about 3,000 civilians held as hostages, after killing most of the men in the group. Colonel Noguchi's soldiers and sailors killed 1,000 men and women.

Iwabuchi and his officers committed suicide at dawn on 26 February. The 5th Cavalry Regiment took the Agricultural Building by 1 March, and the 148th Regiment took the Legislative Building on 28 Feb. and the Finance Building by 3 March.

Army Historian Robert R. Smith wrote:

"Griswold and Beightler were not willing to attempt the assault with infantry alone. Not expressly enjoined from employing artillery, they now planned a massive artillery preparation that would last from 17 to 23 February and would include indirect fire at ranges up to 8,000 yards as well as direct, point-blank fire from ranges as short as 250 yards. They would employ all available corps and division artillery, from 240mm howitzers down. (...) Just how civilian lives could be saved by this type of preparation, as opposed to aerial bombardment, is unknown. The net result would be the same: Intramuros would be practically razed." "That the artillery had almost razed the ancient Walled City could not be helped. To the XIV Corps and the 37th Division at this state of the battle for Manila, American lives were understandably far more valuable than historic landmarks. The destruction stemmed from the American decision to save lives in a battle against Japanese troops who had decided to sacrifice their lives as dearly as possible."

American artillery and military operations, according to one estimate, may have caused 40 percent of total non-combatant Filipino deaths during the battle. 

Before the fighting ended, MacArthur summoned a provisional assembly of prominent Filipinos to Malacañan Palace and in their presence declared the Commonwealth of the Philippines to be permanently reestablished. "My country kept the faith," he told the gathered assembly. "Your capital city, cruelly punished though it be, has regained its rightful place—citadel of democracy in the East."

Aftermath
For the rest of the month the Americans and Filipino guerrillas mopped up resistance throughout the city. With Intramuros secured on 4 March, Manila was officially liberated, albeit completely destroyed with large areas levelled by American bombing. The battle left 1,010 U.S. soldiers dead and 5,565 wounded. At least 100,000 Filipinos civilians were killed, both deliberately by the Japanese in the Manila massacre and from artillery and aerial bombardment by U.S. and Japanese forces. 16,665 Japanese dead were counted within Intramuros alone. In 1946, General Yamashita was executed for war crimes committed during the battle.

Destruction of the city

The battle for Manila was the first and fiercest urban fighting fought by American forces in the entire Pacific War. Few battles in the closing months of World War II exceeded the destruction and the brutality of the massacres and savagery of the fighting in Manila. In Manila's business district only two buildings were not damaged and those two were looted of their plumbing.

A steel flagpole still stands today at the entrance to the old U.S. Embassy building in Ermita, pockmarked by numerous bullet and shrapnel hits, a testament to the intense, bitter fighting for the walled city. In this category, Manila is second to Stalingrad as being the city with the fiercest urban fighting during the war.

Filipinos lost an irreplaceable cultural and historical treasure in the resulting carnage and devastation of Manila, remembered today as a national tragedy. Countless government buildings, universities and colleges, convents, monasteries and churches, and their accompanying treasures dating to the founding of the city, were ruined. The cultural patrimony (including art, literature, and especially architecture) of the Orient's first truly international melting pot – the confluence of Spanish, American and Asian cultures – was eviscerated. Manila, once touted as the "Pearl of the Orient" and famed as a living monument to the meeting of Asian and European cultures, was virtually wiped out.

Most of the buildings damaged during the war were demolished after the Liberation, as part of rebuilding Manila, replacing European style architecture from the Spanish and early American era with modern American style architecture. Only a few old buildings remain intact.

Commemoration

On 18 February 1995, the Memorare-Manila 1945 Foundation dedicated a memorial called the Shrine of Freedom to honor the memory of the over 100,000 civilians killed in the battle. It is also known as the Memorare Manila Monument and is located at Plaza de Santa Isabel in Intramuros. The inscription for the memorial was penned by National Artist for Literature Nick Joaquin and reads:

"This memorial is dedicated to all those innocent victims of war, many of whom went nameless and unknown to a common grave, or even never knew a grave at all, their bodies having been consumed by fire or crushed to dust beneath the rubble of ruins."

"Let this monument be the gravestone for each and every one of the over 100,000 men, women, children and infants killed in Manila during its battle of liberation, 3 February – 3 March 1945. We have not forgotten them, nor shall we ever forget."

"May they rest in peace as part now of the sacred ground of this city: the Manila of our affections."

See also
 Battle of Bataan (1945)
 History of the Philippines
 Military history of Japan
 Military history of the Philippines during World War II
 Military history of the United States

Notes

References
 Battle of Manila Footnotes: Battle for Manila by Richard Connaughton, John Pimlott and Duncan Anderson (2002) Presidio Press 
 World War II in the Pacific: An Encyclopedia (Military History of the United States) by S. Sandler (2000) Routledge 
 By sword and fire: The Destruction of Manila in World War II, 3 February – 3 March 1945 (Unknown Binding) by Alphonso J. Aluit (1994) National Commission for Culture and the Arts

Further reading

External links

 The Battle of Manila Scrapbook
 
 Col. Orin D. "Hard Rock" Haugen
 18 photos that show Manila before and after World War II
 Silverlens:  Teodulo Protomartir, photos of war-damaged Manila 
 Manila Photo Album – Mike Sturm, American photos of war-damaged Manila
 A View to Hugh:  Battle of Manila, American photos of war-damaged Manila

1945 in the Philippines
Battles and operations of World War II involving the Philippines
Battles of World War II involving Japan
Battles of World War II involving the United States
Conflicts in 1945
Urban warfare
20th century in Manila
Japan–United States military relations
Japan–Philippines military relations
Philippines–United States military relations